The folk-rock group Crosby, Stills & Nash have toured annually since 1990 with a few exceptions. In 2000, 2002 and 2006 they reunited with Neil Young to tour. Touring has tended to focus on North America, but the band have also played other parts of the world, notably Europe.

2000 CSNY2K Looking Forward Tour 
Lineup:

 David Crosby - Guitar, Vocals
 Stephen Stills - Guitar, Keyboards, Vocals
 Graham Nash - Guitar, Keyboards, Vocals
 Neil Young - Guitar, Vocals
 Donald Dunn - Bass
 Jim Keltner - Drums

2001 Tour 
Lineup:

 David Crosby - Guitar, Vocals
 Stephen Stills - Guitar, Keyboards, Vocals
 Graham Nash - Guitar, Keyboards, Vocals
 Mike Finnigan - Keyboards
 James Hutchinson - Bass
 Joe Vitale - Drums

2002 CSNY Tour 
Lineup:

 David Crosby - Guitar, Vocals
 Stephen Stills - Guitar, Keyboards, Vocals
 Graham Nash - Guitar, Keyboards, Vocals
 Neil Young - Guitar, Vocals
 Booker T. Jones - Keyboards
 Donald Dunn - Bass
 Steve Potts - Drums

2003 Tour 
Lineup:

 David Crosby - Guitar, Vocals
 Stephen Stills - Guitar, Keyboards, Vocals
 Graham Nash - Guitar, Keyboards, Vocals
 Mike Finnigan - Keyboards
 David Santos  - Bass
 Joe Vitale - Drums

2005 Greatest Hits Tour 
Lineup:

 David Crosby - Guitar, Vocals
 Stephen Stills - Guitar, Keyboards, Vocals
 Graham Nash - Guitar, Keyboards, Vocals
 Jeff Pevar - Guitar
 Mike Finnigan - Keyboards
 James Raymond - Keyboards
 David Santos  - Bass
 Joe Vitale - Drums

2006 CSNY Freedom of Speech Tour 
Lineup:

 David Crosby - Guitar, Vocals
 Stephen Stills - Guitar, Keyboards, Vocals
 Graham Nash - Guitar, Keyboards, Vocals
 Neil Young - Guitar, Vocals
 Ben Keith - Pedal Steel 
 Spooner Oldham - Keyboards
 Rick Rosas - Bass
 Chad Cromwell - Drums 
 Tom Bray - Trumpet

2007 Tour 
Lineup:

 David Crosby - Guitar, Vocals
Stephen Stills - Guitar, Keyboards, Vocals
Graham Nash - Guitar, Keyboards, Vocals
 James Raymond - Keyboards
 Todd Caldwell - Keyboards
 Kevin McCormick - Bass
 Joe Vitale - Drums

2008 Tour 
Lineup:

 David Crosby - Guitar, Vocals
Stephen Stills - Guitar, Keyboards, Vocals
Graham Nash - Guitar, Keyboards, Vocals
 James Raymond - Keyboards
 Todd Caldwell - Keyboards
 Kevin McCormick - Bass
 Joe Vitale - Drums

2009 Demos Tour 
Lineup:

 David Crosby - Guitar, Vocals
Stephen Stills - Guitar, Keyboards, Vocals
Graham Nash - Guitar, Keyboards, Vocals
 James Raymond - Keyboards
 Todd Caldwell - Keyboards
 Kevin McCormick - Bass
 Joe Vitale - Drums

2010 Tour 
Lineup:

 David Crosby - Guitar, Vocals
Stephen Stills - Guitar, Keyboards, Vocals
Graham Nash - Guitar, Keyboards, Vocals
 James Raymond - Keyboards
 Todd Caldwell - Keyboards
 Kevin McCormick - Bass
 Joe Vitale - Drums

2012-13 Tour 
Lineup:

 David Crosby - Guitar, Vocals
Stephen Stills - Guitar, Keyboards, Vocals
Graham Nash - Guitar, Keyboards, Vocals
 Shane Fontayne - Guitars
 James Raymond - Keyboards
 Todd Caldwell - Keyboards
 Kevin McCormick - Bass
 Steve DiStanislao - Drums

2014 Tour 
Lineup:

 David Crosby - Guitar, Vocals
Stephen Stills - Guitar, Keyboards, Vocals
Graham Nash - Guitar, Keyboards, Vocals
 Shane Fontayne - Guitars
 James Raymond - Keyboards
 Todd Caldwell - Keyboards
 Kevin McCormick - Bass
 Steve DiStanislao - Drums

2015 Tour 
Lineup:

 David Crosby - Guitar, Vocals
Stephen Stills - Guitar, Keyboards, Vocals
Graham Nash - Guitar, Keyboards, Vocals
 Shane Fontayne - Guitars
 James Raymond - Keyboards
 Todd Caldwell - Keyboards
 Kevin McCormick - Bass
 Russ Kunkel - Drums

References